On November 22, 2022, a mass shooting occurred at a Walmart Supercenter in Chesapeake, Virginia, United States. Seven people were killed, including the gunman, and four others were injured. The gunman was identified as 31-year-old Andre Marcus Bing, a night-shift manager at the store.

Shooting
On the morning of the shooting, Bing legally purchased the 9 mm handgun used in the shooting. Bing was armed with the handgun and multiple magazines of ammunition. Police responded to reports of a shooting in the store at 10:12 p.m. EST. According to an eyewitness account, Bing "snapped" before shooting a woman, proceeding to kill employees within the break room, and then firing at least ten shots in the grocery aisles.

A survivor reportedly said that she and her coworkers had gathered in the break room to start their shift when the shooting started; her manager entered the room without saying anything and indiscriminately shot at anyone he saw. Another eyewitness account said the gunman was laughing as he opened fire. Another witness said the gunman seemed to be targeting his victims, saying he ordered her from out of a table she was hiding under, saw her face, and told her to go home. Others stated that he seemed to target specific people and shot them multiple times, even if they had already been hit and seemed dead.

Due to the size of the store, it took first responders over 35 to 40 minutes to search the building for additional victims and/or perpetrators. Officers discovered multiple victims in the building, including one near the entrance. The gunman was among the deceased, due to an apparent self-inflicted gunshot wound. The scene was declared safe by law enforcement about an hour after the first reports at 11:20 p.m.

Victims
Six people were shot and killed in the shooting. All of the deceased victims were employed by Walmart. They were Randy Blevins, 70; Fernando Chavez-Barron, 16; Lorenzo Gamble, 43; Tyneka Johnson, 22; Brian Pendleton, 38; and Kellie Pyle, 52.

Perpetrator
The city of Chesapeake and police identified the gunman as night-shift manager Andre Marcus Bing (May 1, 1991 – November 22, 2022). He was a resident of Chesapeake who previously lived in various other cities across the Hampton Roads metropolitan area including Suffolk, Norfolk, and Virginia Beach; and he also lived for a time in Queens, New York, and San Angelo, Texas. Bing started working with Walmart at the Chesapeake location in 2010. According to a company statement, Bing worked as an overnight shift lead. Bing had no criminal record.

Bing's motive is unknown, though an employee at the store alleged that he was planning on killing other Walmart managers. Walmart employees that had worked with Bing described him as difficult and known to be hostile to others.

In a ‘death note’ written on his phone by Bing, he claimed that he was mocked by coworkers and that his phone had been hacked. He repeatedly mentioned God and wanting forgiveness for his actions, claiming that he was "led by Satan". Also described in the note were non-traditional cancer treatments and distress over not having a wife.

Investigation
A joint investigation between the Chesapeake Police Department and the Bureau of Alcohol, Tobacco, Firearms and Explosives is being conducted.

Reactions
Shortly after the shooting, Walmart released a statement expressing "shock at this tragic event at our Chesapeake, Virginia store" and also indicated they were working with local law enforcement with the investigation.

Politicians
On the morning after the shooting, Governor Glenn Youngkin released a statement saying that "our hearts break for the community of Chesapeake...Heinous acts of violence have no place in our communities." Chesapeake mayor Rick West also issued a statement the next morning offering his prayers to the families and thanks to the quick actions of first responders. Senator Mark Warner (D-VA) said he was sickened by the shooting. Virginia state senator Louise Lucas of Virginia's 18th Senate district, which includes Chesapeake, said she was "heartbroken that America's latest mass shooting took place in a Walmart in my district". President Joe Biden shared his condolences and called for gun reform in the U.S.

Lawsuits
Employees have filed two $50 million lawsuits against the company. According to the plaintiffs, Walmart neglected its obligations to ensure staff safety, as complaints were made repeatedly to corporate management regarding the harassing and violent behaviour of the shooter during his employment. According to the statement by the law firm representing the plaintiffs (Morgan & Morgan), "as workplace shootings and violence become horrifyingly common, employers have a responsibility to understand the warning signs and take threats seriously in order to protect their employees and customers".

See also

List of shootings in Virginia
List of mass shootings in the United States in 2022
2019 Virginia Beach shooting

References

2022 active shooter incidents in the United States
2022 crimes in Virginia
2022 mass shootings in the United States
2022 murders in the United States
21st-century mass murder in the United States
Attacks on buildings and structures in 2022
Deaths by firearm in Virginia
History of Chesapeake, Virginia
Mass murder in 2022
Mass murder in Virginia
Mass murder in the United States
Mass shootings in Virginia
Mass shootings in the United States
Murder–suicides in Virginia
November 2022 crimes in the United States
Walmart
Workplace shootings in the United States